Western A.F.C. is a semi-professional association football club in Christchurch, New Zealand. They compete in the Robbie's Premier Football League.

History

1913–1920

Western A.F.C kicked off in 1913 when a small group of keen soccer players at West Christchurch District High School decided to start a team.

The few boys who had played soccer at primary school trained the rest of the team, many of whom had never even seen soccer played before. They challenged St. Bedes for their first game, and in so doing, defied and angered the headmaster, who threatened to expel one of their organisers, Jim Barr. That first team included George Lockwood, Jim Barr, Jack Wilkinson, Eric Nicols, Eric Johnson, Jeff McCree, Jim Smith, and Bob Burgess.

The first year they played as West Christchurch District High against a few other schools, but as the headmaster refused to allow the team to use the school's name for Association games on Saturdays, they used the name ‘Swifts’ from 1914. Although receiving no assistance from the school, the team was helped by the Canterbury Football Association, and went on to win the Schools’ Saturday Competition in 1914. The victory helped to change the headmaster's mind about the team to the extent that he allowed the school's name to be engraved on the trophy.

In 1915 the team changed its name from Swifts to Western A.F.C., and in doing so, changed the team strip from black jersey with a red sash, to a black jersey with the school monogram.

Western first tasted success by winning the Hurley Shield in both 1918 and 1919 (at that time presented to the Junior competition winners), and were duly promoted to the Senior Competition in 1920.

As many of the players had by now left West Christchurch District High, it was decided to open team membership to players from outside the school to keep the team going.

Some of the players who continued their involvement with the club in these early years were J. Smith, A. Andrews, C.J. Hoy and W. Whittington. The club's patron was F.D. Waller, who donated the Waller Medal, presented to the most helpful junior player each year.

One of the club's strongest supporters at this time was George Smith, father of the Smith boys, who feature prominently in the club's history. The first President of the club was E.H. Andrews, who later became Mayor of Christchurch.

By 1920, in just a few years existence, Western was well established as a top senior club in Christchurch, with a well assured future.

1921–1930

Their first taste of cup final play arrived in 1923, when they reached the English Cup knock-out final against the very experienced Rangers team. After ninety minutes of very exciting football, the score was 1–1, so a replay was set. The replay was won by Rangers,1–0.

In spite of this defeat, and after being unplaced in the 1924 season, Western went on to win the English Cup in 1925, by beating another top side then – Nomads, 2–0. This seemed to be the start of a roll for the club.

In 1926, they beat Nomads in the Charity Shield, which was played between the winners of the Hurley Shield and the English Cup holders.

In 1928, the club had its best year to date, winning the Senior Competition for the first time. As Hurley Shield winners, they had reached the top in Christchurch football.

They had another good year in 1930, being runners-up in the Hurley Shield again, as well as joint holders of the English Cup with Thistle, another very good club side of this era.

1931–1940

Two Western teams were entered in the senior Competition, and a third grade team played also. It was decided to hold training at Bucketts Gym on Monday nights at a cost of 9d per person, and to raise funds by means of a club raffle.

The first season of the decade ended with Western winning the Charity Cup and the English Cup.

1935 saw the Club back to its winning form with the Senior team taking both the Hurley Shield and the English Cup.

This was merely a buildup to 1936 when the team not only retained both these prizes, but also the biggest prize, the Chatham Cup, making them the top team in New Zealand. This was the highlight of Western's career to date. In the same year, the club also took the 5th Grade Cup and the Sevicke Jones Cup. Six players were members of the Canterbury team and two, Stan Cawtheray and Merv Gordon also played for New Zealand. The Chatham Cup was played against Thistle of Auckland, Western winning by 3 goals to 2. The trophy was presented by the Governor General, Viscount Galway, in front of a crowd of 4000 people. No-one was more proud than Doug Pearston, Club Captain and selector and trainer of the team, comprising S. Cathway, J. White, W. Ives, A. McMillan, G.Roberts, C. Hall, W. White, G. Ellis, G. Smith, R. Henderson and M. Gordon. Western has also faced Thistle in the English Cup final, winning 5–0. Western had played the entire season without a single defeat.

1941–1950

The 1942 season started with Western beating Nomads 7–1 with Jack Smith scoring 6. Also of note was that George Roberts celebrated 21 years in Senior Football.

Western also set a new senior record beating Thistle 18–3 with the Smiths combining to score 15 goals.

1945 was a great year for Western winning the Chatham Cup 4–3 against Marist of Wellington in extra time at the Basin Reserve. Western also won the Senior Championship scoring 72 goals and conceding only 19.

Four Smith brothers were chosen to represent Canterbury, Gordon, Jack and Roger from Western and Vic from Technical. Also representing Western are G. Graham, M Gordon and G. Anderson.

South Africa toured N.Z in June 1947. Merv Gordon and Gordon Smith selected from Western to represent New Zealand. However N.Z lost all four tests.

1948 was another good year for Western going through the Hurley Shield Senior Competition unbeaten, winning all 14 games, scoring 61 goals and conceding 15. A. Laing, C. Anderson, M. Gordon, R. Dowker, G. Smith, R. Smith and G. Graham were chosen to represent Canterbury.

1951–1960

The decade between 1950 and 1960 was without doubt the best decade that the club experienced.

Western had no less than 26 players who represented Canterbury and eight players representing their Country, they won the Hurley Shield eight times and the English Cup nine times, reached the Chatham Cup finals on three occasions, winning it twice and losing the other. The two seasons they didn't win the Hurley Shield they ended up runners-up in this competition.

Other cups won were the Charity Cup and McFarlane Cup and assorted Junior trophies.

1961–1970

1961 After winning the Hurley Shield first division championship the previous eight seasons, Western's domination of Christchurch soccer ended with a whimper in 1961, when it finished second from bottom. 

In June of 1961, the club announced it had purchased its own ground in St. Albans for a cost of £1500.

1962 Western bounced back to win the championship in 1962 in the closest and most exciting finish in its history. Western, Nomads, and Shamrock were all level on points before the final round, in which Western met Nomads in the feature match at English Park. Shamrock beat City 4–2 in the curtain-raiser, and Western's hopes looked dashed when Nomads took a 2–1 lead five minutes from the finish of the main match. But Terry Haydon equalised, and 18-year-old Martin Clements, in his first senior season, scored in the final seconds to make it 3–2 – and Western had beaten Shamrock for the title by 0.125 of a goal.

1964 This time Gwyn Evan's City team was the local champion, with Western hot on its heels most of the season. A highlight for the club was the selection of forward Derek Torkington for the New Zealand team which played the touring Swiss club FC Basel, and then as the only South Islander in the New Zealand team that made a world tour at the end of the season. This was also the team's last season in black shirts with white sleeves, before switching to today's present colours of red and white.

1966 Although Western finished second behind City again (this time by five points), it was a memorable year – the last time Western reached the Chatham Cup final. After beating City 2–1 in the local final, it beat Nelson Rangers 2–0 and St Kilda 3–1 (after a 1–1 draw) to reach the final. A shot which rolled in off the post early in the second half gave Miramar Rangers a 1–0 win in the final, watched by 4000 – the best cup final crowd at the Basin Reserve for many years. However, it was regarded as a match Western was unlucky to lose – in the first 15 mins Western had a shot cleared off the line, a goal disallowed, and a shot hit the post. The cup final team was: Dave Smith, Phil Frost, Terry Mann, Terry Haydon, Dave Almond, Tommy Langan, Chris Martin, Martin Clements, Tony Treadwell, Alan Brooks and Derek Torkington.

1967 Losing Martin, Haydon and Clements to City and Almond to Australia meant re-building for Western, which made gains in Andy Marshall as player-coach and Clive Rennie, who was a New Zealand representative against Manchester United this season.

References

External links
Western AFC Home
NZ Clubs Database
New Zealand 2004/05 Season Results

Association football clubs in Christchurch
Association football clubs established in 1913
1913 establishments in New Zealand